Rhinoplocephalus is a genus of seasnake in the family Elapidae. The genus is monotypic, containing the sole species Rhinoplocephalus bicolor, known commonly as Müller's snake, Muller's [sic] snake, and the square-nosed snake. The species is endemic to Australia.

Geographic range
Rhinoplocephalus bicolor is found in the Australian state of Western Australia.

Reproduction
Little is known about reproduction in R. bicolor. It is not known for certain whether it is oviparous or viviparous.

References

Further reading
Cogger HG (2014). Reptiles and Amphibians of Australia, Seventh Edition. Clayton, Victoria, Australia: CSIRO Publishing. xxx + 1,033 pp. .
Müller F (1885). "Fierter Nachtrag zum Katalog der herpetologischen Sammlung des Basler Museums ". Verhandlungen der Naturforschenden Gesellschaft in Basel 7: 668-717. (Rhinoplocephalus, new genus, p. 690; R. bicolor, new species, pp. 690-692 + Plate IX, figures f-i ). (in German).
Wilson, Steve; Swan, Gerry (2013). A Complete Guide to Reptiles of Australia, Fourth Edition. Sydney: New Holland Publishers. 522 pp. .

Elapidae
Monotypic snake genera
Snakes of Australia
Taxa named by Fritz Müller (doctor)